Hang On Your Heart is the ninth studio album by American country pop group Exile. It was released in 1985 via Epic Records. The album includes the singles "Hang On to Your Heart", "I Could Get Used to You" "Super Love", "It'll Be Me" and "She's Too Good to Be True".

Track listing

Chart performance

References

1985 albums
Exile (American band) albums
Epic Records albums